Martin of Opava, O.P. (died 1278) also known as Martin of Poland, was a 13th-century Dominican friar, bishop and chronicler.

Life
Known in Latin as Frater Martinus Ordinis Praedicatorum (Brother Martin of the Order of Preachers), he is believed to have been born, at an unknown date, in the Silesian town of Opava, at that time part of the Margraviate of Moravia.

From the middle of the 13th century, Martin was active in Rome as confessor and chaplain for Pope Alexander IV and his successors, Urban IV, Clement IV, Gregory X, Innocent V, Adrian V and John XXI (d. 1277), the last pope to appear in his chronicles. On 22 June 1278, Pope Nicholas III, while in Viterbo, appointed him archbishop of Gniezno.

While travelling to his new episcopal see, Martin died in Bologna, where he was buried at the Basilica of San Domenico, near the tomb of the founder of his Order.

Works
Martin's Latin chronicle, the Chronicon pontificum et imperatorum, was intended for the school-room. It is mostly derivative in content and is therefore of limited value to modern historians. However, its importance is in the way the material is presented, which is a quantum leap forward in didactic method. The genius lies in its layout; each double page covers fifty years with fifty lines per page. The left-hand pages give the history of the papacy, with one line per year, and the right-hand pages give the history of emperors, the two accounts being kept strictly parallel. This was a revolutionary approach in graphic design, which was not appreciated by all his contemporaries: many manuscripts simply copy the text without retaining the page layout, which results in a rather chaotic chronology. The chronicle was enormously influential; over 400 manuscripts are known, and the influence on many dozens of later chroniclers is palpable. Translations were made into many medieval vernaculars, including Middle English, as well as an Old French translation by Sébastien Mamerot in the late 15th century. Martin's Chronicon is the most influential source for the legend of "Pope Joan". Other of his works include the Promptuarium Exemplorum.

References

Further reading 
Anna-Dorothee von den Brincken, "Studien zur Überlieferung der Chronik des Martin von Troppau (Erfahrungen mit einem massenhaft überlieferten historischen Text)", in Deutsches Archiv für Erforschung des Mittelalters, 41 (1985), pp. 460–531.
Wolfgang-Valentin Ikas, "Martinus Polonus' Chronicle of the Popes and Emperors. A Medieval Best-seller and its Neglected Influence on English Medieval Chroniclers", in The English Historical Review, 116 (2001), pp. 327-341 (also )
Wolfgang-Valentin Ikas, "Neue Handschriftenfunde zum Chronicon pontificum et imperatorum des Martin von Troppau", in Deutsches Archiv für Erforschung des Mittelalters, 58 (2002), pp. 521–537.
Wolfgang-Valentin Ikas, Martin von Troppau (Martinus Polonus), O.P. (gest. 1278) in England. Überlieferungs- und wirkungsgeschichtliche Studien zu dessen Papst- und Kaiserchronik (Wissensliteratur im Mittelalter 40) Wiesbaden: Verlag Dr. Ludwig Reichert 2002.  Review article
Ludwig Weiland (ed.), "Martini Oppaviensis chronicon pontificum et imperatorum". MGH SS 22 (1872), pp. 377–475 Faksimile bei Gallica
H. Daniel Embree (ed.), The Chronicles of Rome. An Edition of the Middle English 'The Chronicle of Popes and Emperors' and 'The Lollard Chronicle', Woodbridge 1999.

External links

Digital facsimile of a German translation of his chronicle in the Heidelberg manuscript Cpg 137
Edition of this translation, 1858

Information about a French dissertation on the Promptuarium Exemplorum
 Virtual tour Gniezno Cathedral  

13th-century births
1278 deaths
People from Opava
13th-century Polish historians
Czech Dominicans
Dominican scholars
Dominican bishops
13th-century Roman Catholic archbishops in Poland
Archbishops of Gniezno
13th-century Latin writers
Burials at the Basilica of San Domenico